The Moderate Labour Party was a minor political party in the United Kingdom.  It was founded in about 1985 by former members of the Labour Party who were opposed to the miners' strike.

It was particularly active in Nottinghamshire. It stood 26 candidates in local elections, including five sitting councillors, none of whom won their seats. They stood two candidates in the 1987 general election against left wing Labour candidates, with chairman Brian Marshall standing in Mansfield  against Alan Meale, and another candidate standing in Batley and Spen. Benefiting from the endorsement of retiring Labour MP Don Concannon, Marshall won 1,580 votes. The Conservative Party nearly took the seat, with the majority slashed from 2,216 to just 56.

The party again stood in the European Parliament election, 1994, winning 12,113 votes but not coming close to winning a seat.

See also
Union of Democratic Mineworkers

References

Political parties established in 1985
Defunct political parties in England
1985 establishments in England
Labour Party (UK) breakaway groups